Third Person is a 2013 romantic drama film directed and written by Paul Haggis and starring an ensemble cast consisting of Liam Neeson, Mila Kunis, Adrien Brody, Olivia Wilde, James Franco, Moran Atias, Kim Basinger, and Maria Bello. The film premiered at the 2013 Toronto Film Festival.

Plot
The film tells three inter-connected love stories that take place in Paris, New York and Rome/Taranto.

Paris: Michael, a writer who recently left his wife Elaine, receives a visit from his lover Anna. The story explores their very complicated on/off relationship due to her inability to commit because of a terrible secret.

New York: Julia, an ex-soap opera actress turned hotel maid is accused of harming her young son, a charge which she firmly denies. As a result of these charges, he is now in the custody of her ex-husband Rick who is trying everything in his power to take the boy away from her. Meanwhile, she is trying at all costs to regain custody of her son.

Rome and Taranto: Scott, an American business man on a trip to Italy, falls in love with a Romani woman, Monika. Scott is inevitably drawn into a plot where he tries to free Monika's daughter who has been kidnapped by an Italian gangster in Taranto city and is being held for ransom. Emotions run high as the viewer and Scott question whether this is a set up or not.

Cast
 Liam Neeson as Michael Leary
 Olivia Wilde as Anna Barr
 James Franco as Rick Weiss
 Mila Kunis as Julia Weiss
 Adrien Brody as Scott Lowry
 Moran Atias as Monika
 Maria Bello as Theresa Lowry
 Kim Basinger as Elaine Leary
 Caroline Goodall as Dr. Gertner
 David Harewood as Jake Long
 Riccardo Scamarcio as Marco
 Loan Chabanol as Sam
 Patrick Duggan as NYC Hotel Bell Man.

Release
The first international trailer of the film was released on 15 April 2014, followed by a domestic poster the following day. The first US trailer was released on 18 April. The film was released in the United States on 20 June 2014.

Reception

Box office
Third Person had a limited release on June 20, 2014 and grossed $1,021,398 million in the United States and Canada and $1,603,363 million in other territories for a worldwide total of $2,624,761.

Critical response
Third Person received negative reviews from critics. The film has a 25% approval rating on the review aggregator website Rotten Tomatoes, based on 107 reviews with an average rating of 4.50/10, with the consensus: "Third Person finds writer-director Paul Haggis working with a stellar cast and a worthy premise; unfortunately, he fails to fashion a consistently compelling movie out of the intriguing ingredients at his disposal." Metacritic gave the film a rating of 38/100, based on 33 reviews.

Home media
The film was released on DVD and Blu-ray Disc on 30 September 2014.

References

External links

 
 
 
 
 

2013 films
2013 independent films
2013 romantic drama films
American independent films
American romantic drama films
Belgian independent films
Belgian romantic drama films
British independent films
British romantic drama films
English-language German films
Films about actors
Films about businesspeople
Films about dysfunctional families
Films about infidelity
Films about writers
Films directed by Paul Haggis
Films produced by Michael Nozik
Films scored by Dario Marianelli
Films set in New York City
Films set in Paris
Films set in Rome
Films shot in Rome
German independent films
German romantic drama films
Films with screenplays by Paul Haggis
Sony Pictures Classics films
2010s English-language films
2010s American films
2010s British films
2010s German films
English-language Belgian films